Tom Powell (born 2 March 2002) is an Australian rules footballer who plays for  in the Australian Football League (AFL).

Early football
Powell participated in the Auskick program at Concordia, South Australia and began his junior football at the Unley Jets Football Club in Kingswood, South Australia. He began studying at Scotch College in Adelaide when he reached Year 8. He played school football there for the duration of his studies. He averaged 24.3 disposals a game, and won the McCallum Tomkins Medal for the best player in the SANFL Under 18s.

AFL career
On debut, Powell kicked a goal with his first kick, and collected 12 disposals overall with 3 marks and 4 rebound 50s.

Statistics
 Statistics are correct to the end of round 14 2021.

|- style="background-color: #EAEAEA"
! scope="row" style="text-align:center" | 2021
|
| 24 || 13 || 4 || 2 || 107 || 109 || 216 || 47 || 47 || 0.3 || 0.1 || 8.2 || 8.3 || 16.6 || 3.6 || 3.6
|- class="sortbottom"
! colspan=3| Career
! 13
! 4
! 2
! 107
! 109
! 216
! 47
! 47
! 0.3
! 0.1
! 8.2
! 8.3
! 16.6
! 3.6
! 3.6
|}

References

External links

2002 births
Living people
North Melbourne Football Club players
Sturt Football Club players
Australian rules footballers from South Australia